Lehkonen is a surname. Notable people with the surname include:

Artturi Lehkonen (born 1995), Finnish professional ice hockey forward
Ismo Lehkonen (born 1962), Finnish former professional ice hockey goaltender

See also
Lehtonen

Finnish-language surnames